Megdiin Khoilogdorj (born 7 May 1948) is a Mongolian former wrestler who competed in the 1972 Summer Olympics and in the 1976 Summer Olympics.

References

External links
 

1948 births
Living people
Olympic wrestlers of Mongolia
Wrestlers at the 1972 Summer Olympics
Wrestlers at the 1976 Summer Olympics
Mongolian male sport wrestlers
20th-century Mongolian people
21st-century Mongolian people